Different Things is the ninth studio album by American country music artist Tracy Byrd. It was released in 2006 on Byrd's own Blind Mule label. The songs "Cheapest Motel" and "Better Places Than This" were released as singles. The former reached a peak of #55 on the Hot Country Songs charts in 2006.

Track listing
"Different Things" (Brice Long, Bobby Taylor, John Ramey) – 3:32
"The More I Feel Like Rockin'" (Mark Nesler, Tony Martin, Jim Collins) – 3:11
"She Was Smart" (Tracy Byrd, Martin, Nesler) – 3:01
"A Cowboy and a Dancer" (Kevin Denney, John Edwards) – 3:45
"The Biggest Thing in Texas" (Phyllis Austin, Mike Geiger, Woody Mullis) – 2:40
"Just One Woman" (Ramey) – 4:19
"Saltwater Cowboy" (J.R. Shelby, Phil O'Donnell, Cyril Rawson) – 3:48
"Cheapest Motel" (Cole Deggs, Geiger, Trey Matthews) – 3:48
"Better Places Than This" (Geiger, Mullis, Mike Huffman) – 3:51
"Before I Die" (Matthews, Mullis) – 4:58
"Hot Night in the Country" (Byrd, Nesler, Martin) – 3:40

Personnel
 Tracy Byrd - lead vocals
 Joe Lee Carter - background vocals
 J.T. Corenflos - electric guitar
 Mike Geiger - harmonica
 Kevin "Swine" Grantt - bass guitar
 Tommy Harden - drums
 Aubrey Haynie - fiddle
 Mike Johnson - steel guitar
 Gordon Mote - keyboards
 Gary Prim - keyboards
 John Wesley Ryles - background vocals
 Marty Slayton - background vocals
 Mike Taliaferro - background vocals
 Biff Watson - acoustic guitar
 Glenn Worf - bass guitar

Chart performance

External links
[ Different Things] at Allmusic

2006 albums
Tracy Byrd albums